The Philippine Badminton Association (PBAD) is the national governing body for badminton in the Philippines. The country joined International Badminton Federation in 1950 but it was not until 1952 the country organized its association.

In December 2022, the PBAD announced it would be national ranking system the following year in conjunction with the return of the Philippine Badminton Open.

Tournaments
 Philippines Open

Notable players
Adriano Torres
Arnie Ladjai
Amparo Lim
Kennevic Asuncion
Kennie Asuncion
Paula Lynn Obañana

See also
Philippines national badminton team

References

External links
Philippine Badminton Association profile at the Philippine Olympic Committee website

National members of the Badminton World Federation
 
Badminton
1952 establishments in the Philippines